The Walk of the Stars is a section of the Bandstand Promenade in Bandra, Mumbai honouring Bollywood film stars. The path features about six statues of famous Bollywood actors as well as about 100 brass plates embossed with the handprints and signatures of other stars. The walk is inspired by the Hollywood Walk of Fame. It is funded and privately managed by UTV and promoted through their UTV Stars television channel. The walk is 2 km long. It was inaugurated by actress Kareena Kapoor on 28 March 2012, with actor Randhir Kapoor and filmmaker Madhur Bhandarkar also present.

Cost
A brass statue on the Walk of Stars cost .

Stars honoured

The following stars had been honoured with an autograph, tile or statue on the Walk of the Stars.

See also
Bollywood
Bandstand Promenade
Hollywood Walk of Fame

References

Hindi cinema
Tourist attractions in Mumbai
Walks of fame
Halls of fame in India
2012 establishments in Maharashtra
2014 disestablishments in India
Awards established in 2012
Entertainment halls of fame
Bandra
Defunct tourist attractions in India